Nowe Gralewo  is a village in the administrative district of Gmina Raciąż, within Płońsk County, Masovian Voivodeship, in east-central Poland.

The village has a population of 124.

References

Nowe Gralewo